Thinakkural is a Tamil newspaper published in Sri Lanka. It was founded by Pon Rajagobal, former editor of Virakesari in 1997. There have reported number of attempts to force the paper to stop its distribution in recent times.

See also
List of newspapers in Sri Lanka

References

External links
 Thinakkural

Daily newspapers published in Sri Lanka
Newspapers established in 1997
Tamil-language newspapers published in Sri Lanka